Creston Municipal Airport  is a city-owned public-use airport located three nautical miles (6 km) south of the central business district of Creston, a city in Union County, Iowa, United States. It is included in the National Plan of Integrated Airport Systems for 2011–2015, which categorized it as a general aviation facility.

Facilities and aircraft 
Creston Municipal Airport covers an area of 360 acres (146 ha) at an elevation of 1,300 feet (396 m) above mean sea level. It has two runways: 16/34 is 4,901 by 75 feet (1,494 x 23 m) with an asphalt surface and 4/22 is 1,692 by 100 feet (516 x 30 m) with a turf surface.

For the 12-month period ending September 16, 2010, the airport had 4,500 general aviation aircraft operations, an average of 12 per day. At that time there were 17 aircraft based at this airport: 94% single-engine and 6% ultralight.

References

External links 
 Creston Municipal Airport at City of Creston website
 Creston Municipal (CSQ) at Iowa DOT airport directory
 Aerial image as of July 1995 from USGS The National Map
 

Creston, Iowa
Airports in Iowa
Transportation buildings and structures in Union County, Iowa